Tiên Phước is a rural district (huyện) of Quảng Nam province in the South Central Coast region of Vietnam. As of 2003 the district had a population of 73,717. The district covers an area of 453 km². The district capital lies at Tiên Kỳ.

References

Districts of Quảng Nam province